Eddie O'Halloran (born 11 March 1943) is  a former Australian rules footballer who played with Footscray in the Victorian Football League (VFL).

Notes

External links 
		

Living people
1943 births
Australian rules footballers from Victoria (Australia)
Western Bulldogs players